Acyl-CoA dehydrogenase, C-2 to C-3 short chain is an enzyme that in humans is encoded by the ACADS gene.  This gene encodes a tetrameric mitochondrial flavoprotein, which is a member of the acyl-CoA dehydrogenase family. This enzyme catalyzes the initial step of the mitochondrial fatty acid beta-oxidation pathway. The ACADS gene associated with short-chain acyl-coenzyme A dehydrogenase deficiency.

Structure

The ACADS gene is approximately 13 kb in length and has 10 exons. The coding sequence of this gene is 1239 bp long. The encoded protein has 412 amino acids, and its size is 44.3 kDa (Human) or 44.9 KDa (Mouse).

Function 

The SCAD enzyme catalyzes the first part of fatty acid beta-oxidation by forming a C2-C3 trans-double bond in the fatty acid through dehydrogenation of the flavoenzyme. SCAD is specific to short-chain fatty acids, between C2 and C3-acylCoA. The final result of beta-oxidation is acetyl-CoA. When there are defects that result in SCAD being misfolded, there is an increased production of reactive oxygen species (ROS); the increased ROS forces the mitochondria to undergo fission, and the mitochondrial reticulum takes on a grain-like structure.

Clinical significance

Mutations of the ACADS gene are associated with deficiency of the short-chain acyl-coenzyme A dehydrogenase protein (SCADD); this is also known as butyryl-CoA dehydrogenase deficiency. Many mutations have been identified in specific populations, and large-scale studies have been performed to determine the allelic and genotypic frequency for the defective gene. As short-chain acyl-CoA dehydrogenase is involved in beta-oxidation, a deficiency in this enzyme is marked by an increased amount of fatty acids. This deficiency is characterized by the presence of increased butyrylcarnitine (C4) in blood plasma, and increased ethylmalonic acid (EMA) concentrations in urine. Genotypes of individuals with this deficiency have it as a result of a mutation, variant, or a combination of the two. Among one population with the disease, three subgroups have been identified: one group has a failure to thrive, feeding difficulties, and hypotonia; another group had seizures; finally, one group had hypotonia and no seizures. Other studies showed that the deficiency may be asymptomatic in some individuals under normal conditions, with symptoms presenting under physiological stress conditions such as fasting or illness. The treatment of this deficiency can sometimes be unclear, because it can sometimes be asymptomatic. The treatment for this disease is similar to treatment of other fatty acid oxidation disorders, by trying to restore biochemical and physiologic homeostasis, by promoting anabolism and providing alternative sources of energy. 
 Flavin adenine dinucleotide supplementation has also been identified as a therapy for this deficiency, because it is an essential cofactor for proper function of SCAD. SCAD deficiency is inherited in an autosomal recessive manner. Carrier testing can be performed for at-risk family members, and prenatal testing is also a possibility. 

The ACADS gene has also been implicated in delaying the onset of Prader-Willi Syndrome, which is characterized by hypotonia, growth failure, and neurodevelopmental delays in the first years of life, and hyperphagia and obesity much later.

In Genome Wide Association Studies (GWAS), SCAD has been associated with a reduced amount of insulin release shown by an oral glucose tolerance test, or OGTT.

See also 
 Acyl CoA dehydrogenase

References

External links 
  GeneReviews/NCBI/NIH/UW entry on Short-Chain Acyl-CoA Dehydrogenase Deficiency